The Confederate Memorial Arch is a monument located in Cleburne, Texas in memory of the Confederacy The arch stands on the edge of the Cleburne Memorial Cemetery.

History 
In 1894 land was donated by Ann and C.Y. Kouns for the cemetery to build a Confederate Park that would be used by the local United Confederate Veterans. In 1922 'The Confederate Memorial Park Committee' was established with the intention to create a memorial to the Confederate soldiers buried in the cemetery. The archway was designed at an angle so that a Confederate Battle Flag design could be formed in the grounds. Construction was complete in 1922, however the flag design was never implemented.

See also 

 Statue of Patrick Cleburne (Cleburne, Texas)

References 

1922 establishments in Texas
Confederate States of America monuments and memorials in Texas
Buildings and structures in Cleburne, Texas
Buildings and structures in Johnson County, Texas